Rodney Sullivan is an American politician in Alabama. Sullivan is a member of the Alabama House of Representatives for he 61st district, and is a member of the Republican Party. He was elected to the Alabama House of Representatives in 2018.

See also 

 2018 United States House of Representatives elections in North Carolina

References 

Living people
Year of birth missing (living people)
Republican Party members of the Alabama House of Representatives
21st-century American politicians